Clelia scytalina, commonly known as the Mexican snake eater or zopilota de altura (highland mussarana),  is a species of snake in the family Colubridae. The species is endemic to the New World.

Geographic range
C. scytalina is found in Southern Mexico, Central America, and Colombia.

Description
The head of C. scytalina is somewhat distinct from the neck. The eye is moderate in size, with a vertically elliptical pupil. The body is cylindrical, and the tail is moderately long.

The smooth dorsal scales are arranged in 17 rows at midbody.

The coloration of juveniles is completely different from that of adults. Juveniles have a black head, a yellow or white nuchal crossband (collar), and a red body. Juveniles are often mistaken for coral snakes and killed. Adults are uniform bluish black dorsally, and cream-colored ventrally.

Habitat
C. scytalina is a terrestrial animal which inhabits old-growth and second-growth forests and their borders.  Occasionally it is found in open areas in submontane and montane life zones.

Diet
Like other species of mussurana, C. scytalina is known to feed on other snakes.

Reproduction
Clelia scytalina is oviparous (egg-laying).

References

External links
Clelia scytalina at the Encyclopedia of Life.

Further reading
Cope ED (1867). Proc. Acad. Nat. Sci. Philadelphia 18 ["1866"]: 317–323. (Scolecophis scytalinus, new species, p. 320.).
Muñoz Chacón, Federico; Johnston, Richard Dennis (2013). Amphibians and Reptiles of Costa Rica: A Pocket  Guide. Ithaca, New York: Comstock. 170 pp. .

Mussuranas
Clelia
Snakes of Central America
Reptiles of Colombia
Reptiles of Mexico
Reptiles described in 1867